Stuart Holden is an English former professional darts player.

Career
Holden played in the 1983 BDO World Darts Championship, losing in the first round to Les Capewell.  He had earlier lost in the first round of the 1980 Winmau World Masters to Jocky Wilson and reached the second round of the 1982 British Professional, beating Rab Smith in the first round before losing to Eric Bristow.

24 years after his appearance in the World Championship, Holden qualified for the PDC UK Open winning his preliminary and first round matches before losing in the second round to Nigel Birch.  He then qualified for the 2007 Las Vegas Desert Classic, winning one of eight places in the second of the two qualifiers for the event.  After an early exit in the first qualifier to Mick McGowan, Holden went on to defeat the likes of Dave Ladley, Andy Jenkins and Steve Hine to earn qualification.  He was defeated in the first round by Gary Mawson.

Following his qualification to the Desert Classic, Holden joined the PDC full-time but has failed to make any real progress in floor tournaments and has failed to qualify for any of the majors tournaments since.

World Championship results

BDO
 1983: Last 32: (lost to Les Capewell 1–2) (sets)

External links 
 Profile and stats on Darts Database

English darts players
Living people
Year of birth missing (living people)
British Darts Organisation players
Professional Darts Corporation former pro tour players
21st-century English people